Flying Officer Roderick Borden Gray, GC (2 October 191727 August 1944), known as Cy Gray, of the Royal Canadian Air Force was posthumously awarded the George Cross for his self-sacrifice in putting the lives of his comrades ahead of his own.

F/O Gray was attached to RAF 172 Squadron flying Vickers Wellington bombers on anti submarine patrols. On the night of 26/27 August 1944 his Wellington bomber attacked the Type IXC/40 U-534 in the Bay of Biscay. Anti aircraft return fire from the U boat brought the Wellington down into the sea. The surviving four members of the Wellington crew had only a single man dinghy between them, he helped two wounded crewmen into a dinghy but refused to climb aboard it himself, fearing it would capsize and imperil them all.  Despite his own severe injuries he clung to the side of the dinghy instead, losing consciousness after several hours in the frigid water and drowning.  His colleagues were eventually rescued by a Sunderland flying boat of 10 Squadron RAAF after 15 hours in the water and their account prompted the award.  He was originally nominated for the Albert Medal.  Notice of his award appeared in the London Gazette on March 13, 1945.

The 155 Royal Canadian Air Cadet Squadron is named in his honour.

References

External links
 CWGC: Roderick Borden Gray

1917 births
1944 deaths
Canadian recipients of the George Cross
Royal Canadian Air Force personnel of World War II
People from Sault Ste. Marie, Ontario
Royal Canadian Air Force officers
Canadian military personnel killed in World War II
Canadian military personnel from Ontario